Labourdette is a French surname derived from Gascon language 

People with the surname Labourdette include:
 Elina Labourdette (1919-2014), French film actress
 Jacques Henri-Labourdette (1915-2003), French architect.
 Bernard Labourdette (1946-2022), professional road bicycle racer

See also 
 Laborde

Occitan-language surnames